This article lists events from the year 2021 in Malawi.

Incumbents
 President: Lazarus Chakwera (from 2020)
 Vice-President: Saulos Chilima (from 2020)

Events
Ongoing – COVID-19 pandemic in Malawi

January 
12 January – President Chakwera declares a state of disaster amid a spike in coronavirus infections after two cabinet ministers die from COVID-19.
18 January – COVID-19 pandemic: The country goes under lockdown for the first time since the pandemic began. Malawi has recorded 12,470 coronavirus cases and 314 deaths, but there has been a 40% increase in infections in January.

November 

 17 November – Police fired tear gas to quell an anti-government protest against deteriorating economic conditions and rising cost of living in Malawi. Hundreds of people poured onto the streets of the southern commercial hub of Blantyre, calling on President Lazarus Chakwera’s administration to take immediate steps to rein in soaring prices and unemployment. The protesters set tires on fire and blocked roads to bring traffic to a halt in parts of the city, and also torched a police post in Blantyre’s central business district. “They have failed to fulfill their promises of easing the suffering of Malawians. The cost of living is too high as prices of essentials, including food and fuel, are soaring.”

Deaths
12 January 
Lingson Belekanyama, politician, Local Government Minister; COVID-19.
Sidik Mia, 56, politician, MP (2004–2014), Minister of Defence (2009–2010), Minister of Transport and Public Works (since 2020); COVID-19.
31 January – Wambali Mkandawire, jazz musician; COVID-19.

See also
2021 in East Africa
COVID-19 pandemic in Africa

References

External links

 
2020s in Malawi
Years of the 21st century in Malawi
Malawi
Malawi